Apple Look Around is a technology featured in Apple Maps that provides interactive panoramas from positions along a number of streets in various countries.
Look Around allows the user to view 360° street-level imagery, with smooth transitions as the scene is navigated. Look Around was introduced with iOS 13 at Apple Worldwide Developers Conference in June 2019. It was publicly released as part of iOS 13 on September 19, 2019.

Background

In early 2015, vehicles equipped with twelve cameras and lidar sensors were seen in a variety of locations in the United States. These vehicles were owned by Apple and were also seen in places like the United Kingdom, Ireland, France, and Sweden. In June 2015, Apple stated on its website that the vehicles were collecting data to improve Apple Maps. Also, Apple claimed to secure privacy by making faces and license plates unrecognizable. In 2018 Apple confirmed in an article that it was rebuilding Apple Maps, with the first results rolled out in California.

In 2017, Apple had started mapping Spain, Portugal, Croatia, and Slovenia. A year later, in 2018, Apple had started collecting imagery in Japan.

In May 2019, Apple announced plans to begin collecting data for Apple Maps in Canada. Overall in 2019, Apple had started collecting imagery in Andorra, Canada, San Marino, Germany and Australia.

During WWDC on June 22, 2020, Apple announced its new maps would be coming to Ireland, the United Kingdom, and Canada later in the year. Overall in 2020, Apple had started collecting imagery in Monaco, Belgium, the Netherlands, Finland, Norway, Israel, New Zealand and Singapore.

During WWDC 2021 on June 7, 2021, Apple announced that Spain and Portugal would receive the new maps that day, with both Australia and Italy getting them later in the year. On September 10, 2021, Apple published new map data in Andorra, Italy, San Marino, and Vatican City. Apple began testing its new maps in Australia on October 19, 2021, publishing the new data on December 9, 2021. Overall in 2021, Apple started collecting imagery in Hungary, Hong Kong, Luxembourg, Liechtenstein, Poland, the Czech Republic, Austria, Switzerland, and Taiwan.

On March 7, 2022, Apple started collecting imagery in Greece. On March 4, 2022, Apple began testing its new map in Germany and Singapore. On April 21, 2022, Munich and most of Singapore received Look Around alongside the new maps. On May 14, 2022, Apple started collecting imagery in Denmark. On May 29, 2022, Apple began testing its new map in France, Monaco, and New Zealand, with the maps launching on July 7, 2022. On June 3, 2022, Apple announced a first round of imagery collection in Mexico, which began in August 2022. During Apple's WWDC event in June 2022, it was announced that eleven new countries would receive the new maps by the end of the year, including Belgium, Israel, Liechtenstein, Luxembourg, Netherlands, Palestinian Territories, Saudi Arabia, and Switzerland. The Look Around feature was enabled in all of Germany on July 25, 2022.

Apple started testing its new map data in Israel, the Palestinian Territories, and Saudi Arabia on August 5, 2022. In September 2022, Apple announced the start of image collection in Thailand, which began in October 2022. On November 2, 2022, Apple started testing its new map data in Belgium, Liechtenstein, Luxembourg, the Netherlands, and Switzerland. The new data was released on December 15, 2022, alongside Israel, Palestinian Territories, and Saudi Arabia.

Overall in 2022, Apple began collecting imagery in Greece, Denmark, Mexico, and Thailand.

On January 23, 2023, Apple began testing its new map data in Austria, Finland, Norway, and Sweden. On March 2, 2023, the new maps were launched in Finland, Norway, and Sweden. On March 10, 2023, Apple began testing its new map data in Austria, Croatia, the Czech Republic, Hungary, Poland, and Slovenia.

As of March 2023, Look Around covers roughly 51 areas, including parts of the United Kingdom (which includes the overseas territory of Gibraltar), Ireland, Canada, Japan, Andorra, Spain (including the Balearic and Canary Islands), Portugal, Italy (including Sardinia and Sicily), San Marino, Australia, Germany, Singapore, France, New Zealand, the United States, Israel, Belgium, Liechtenstein, Luxembourg, the Netherlands, Switzerland, Norway, Sweden, and Finland.

Refine Location
In iOS 14, Apple released a new feature called Refine Location in Apple Maps: if the app cannot otherwise get precise location information, it prompts the user to scan the surrounding area. This uses Look Around data to improve the accuracy of the current location. As of May 2021, The following areas have received the Refine Location feature:

AR Walking Directions
In iOS 15, Apple released a feature called AR Walking Directions in Apple Maps, where the user scans the surrounding area and will show directions. Much like Refine Location, this feature makes use of the surrounding area and improves the accuracy of directions. As of December 2022, The following areas have received AR Walking Directions:

Timeline of introductions

Coverage

Future coverage
According to the company, Apple's vehicles and pedestrians have visited, or are scheduled to visit, the following countries and territories:

Note: While the new map covers Monaco, Palestinian Territories, Saudi Arabia, and Vatican City, these countries lack the Look Around feature.

See also
Google Street View
List of street view services

References

Computer-related introductions in 2019
Internet properties established in 2019
Street view services
Apple Inc. software